Leonard Wendelin Mitzel (February 18, 1946 – March 19, 2017) was a Canadian politician and former Member of the Legislative Assembly of Alberta representing the constituency of Cypress-Medicine Hat as a Progressive Conservative.

Early life

Mitzel was born in St. Michael's Hospital in Lethbridge and spent his early years in a farming environment near the now ghost town of Hoping, Alberta, southeast of Foremost, Alberta. After graduating from high school, he took a job as a surveyor for Alberta Transportation where he worked for seven years. During that time Mitzel rose through the ranks to become responsible for two crews, which were focused on the preliminary design and construction of major highways in southern Alberta. He then enrolled at the University of Lethbridge as a second-year pre-engineering student. When his father died in 1977, Mitzel returned to Foremost to run the family farm.

Political life

Mitzel was elected to a second term representing the constituency of Cypress-Medicine Hat in the 2008 provincial election, where he received 63 per cent of the vote. He served as Deputy Chair of Committees. Mitzel chaired the Legislative Offices Committee and sat on the Select Special Ethics Commissioner Search Committee.

While in office, he continually advocated for a 24-hour Montana-Alberta border crossing at Wild Horse and the development of an alternative north-south transportation corridor along the east side of Alberta and supported the Canadian Centre for Unmanned Vehicle Systems at Defence R&D Canada at Suffield. In addition, Mitzel was the chair of the Montana-Alberta Bilateral Advisory Council, Alberta chair for the Pacific Northwest Economic Region and the Alberta representative on the Canadian/American Border Trade Alliance.

First elected in 2004, Mitzel received 55 per cent of the vote in his constituency. After he was elected, he served on numerous committees, including chairing the Alberta Rail Crossing Study and the Health Facilities Review Committee, and co-chairing the Ambulance Governance Review Council. He lost his seat in the 2012 Alberta Provincial Election to Drew Barnes, Wildrose Party candidate.

Prior to entering provincial politics, Mitzel was a councillor in the County of Forty Mile No. 8 for 15 years and the Reeve for the last 12 years on the council. Concurrently, he sat on the board of the Palliser Health Region for six years and served as chair for four of those years.

Personal life

Mitzel and his wife, June Cole Mitzel, lived in Etzikom, Alberta. They were founding members and volunteer curators for the Etzikom Museum and the Canadian National Historic Windmill Centre [www.facebook.com/etzikommuseum]. In these endeavours, Mitzel was awarded the Lyle Flynn Award for Tourism Promotion for South East Alberta and a TIALTA Small Attractions Award.

He received a number of awards honouring his involvement in his community, including a 125th Anniversary of the Confederation of Canada Medal in 1992, Queen Elizabeth II Golden Jubilee Medal in 2002 and an Alberta Centennial Medal in 2005. While Mitzel was chair of the South East Alberta Water Task Force, the committee was awarded an Emerald Award for its work reclaiming abandoned water wells.

Mitzel was a father of two and grandfather of seven. He enjoyed music, theatre, hunting, trail riding and golf.

Mitzel died on March 19, 2017, in Medicine Hat, Alberta from cancer, aged 71.

Election results

References

Progressive Conservative Association of Alberta MLAs
People from Lethbridge
21st-century Canadian politicians
2017 deaths
1946 births